Daniel Antonio Cardoso (born 6 October 1989) is a South African soccer player who plays as a defender for Sekhukhune United in the Premier Soccer League.

Early life
Cardoso was born in Johannesburg. His father grew up in Portugal, while his mother is a native South African. Cardoso aspired to be a veterinarian, but dropped out of school in 2003 to pursue his soccer career. Despite earning R100,000 a month, he still advises people to embrace education.

Club career
Cardoso made his professional debut for the Free State Stars on 11 August 2012 in a 2–0 holme win over the Bidvest Wits. Cardoso was made vice-captain in 2014. In July 2014, Cardoso suffered a shin injury which ruled him out for five months. Cardoso joined the Kaizer Chiefs on 31 May 2015. After spending 7 years with the Chiefs, Cardoso left on 1 June 2022 and became a free agent.

International career
Cardoso made his international debut in a 3–1 win over Swaziland on 25 March 2015.

References

External links

1988 births
South African soccer players
Living people
Association football defenders
Soccer players from Johannesburg
White South African people
Free State Stars F.C. players
South African people of Portuguese descent
Highlands Park F.C. players
Kaizer Chiefs F.C. players
Sekhukhune United F.C. players
South African Premier Division players
Lusitano F.C. (South Africa) players